Francisco Rivera Jr. (born October 8, 1981) is an American mixed martial artist who last competed in XMMA. A professional since 2008, he has also competed for the WEC and Tachi Palace Fights. Rivera is known for his heavy hands and wild fighting style.

Background 
Rivera graduated from Buena Park High School where he excelled in football eventually playing for Orange Coast College, until his foot was broken.

Mixed martial arts career

World Extreme Cagefighting 
Rivera made his WEC debut replacing an injured Josh Grispi against Erik Koch at WEC 52. He lost the fight via TKO in the first round.

Ultimate Fighting Championship 
On October 28, 2010, World Extreme Cagefighting merged with the Ultimate Fighting Championship. As part of the merger, most WEC fighters were transferred into the UFC.

Rivera was expected to drop to Bantamweight and face Takeya Mizugaki on March 3, 2011 at UFC Live: Sanchez vs. Kampmann. However, Rivera was forced out of the bout with an injury and replaced by promotional newcomer Reuben Duran.

Rivera faced Reuben Duran on June 4, 2011 at The Ultimate Fighter 13 Finale. He lost the fight via submission in the third round and was subsequently released from the promotion.

Return to the UFC 
Following two emphatic first round stoppages on the regional circuit, Rivera was re-signed by the UFC to face Alex Soto on May 15, 2012 at UFC on Fuel TV: The Korean Zombie vs. Poirier, replacing Azamat Gashimov who was removed from the bout. Rivera won the fight via unanimous decision (30–27, 30–27, 30–27).

Rivera was expected to replace Edwin Figueroa against Ken Stone on June 22, 2012 at UFC on FX 4. However, Rivera was forced out of the bout with an injury and replaced by Dustin Pague.

Rivera faced Roland Delorme on July 21, 2012 at UFC 149. Rivera defeated Delorme via first-round KO. However, Rivera later failed his post-fight drug test for an over-the-counter stimulant and the win was overturned to a No Contest.

After being clipped twice in the first round, Rivera rallied to defeat Edwin Figueroa on February 2, 2013 at UFC 156 in the second round, staggering him before getting a TKO stoppage.

Rivera was expected to face Hugo Viana on April 20, 2013 at UFC on Fox 7.  However, Rivera was forced out of the bout with an injury and replaced by T.J. Dillashaw.

Rivera was expected to face George Roop on October 19, 2013 at UFC 166. However, the pairing was shifted to November 6, 2013 at UFC Fight Night 31. He won the fight via TKO in the second round.

Rivera was expected to face Raphael Assunção at UFC 170. However, Rivera was forced out of the bout due to injury.

Rivera faced Takeya Mizugaki on May 24, 2014 at UFC 173. He lost the fight via unanimous decision.

Rivera faced Urijah Faber on December 6, 2014 at UFC 181.  Rivera lost the fight via second round submission. However, the ending was controversial as Faber stunned Rivera with an eyepoke during a standup exchange. The eyepoke went unnoticed by the referee, but immediately preceded the fight ending submission.  Rivera's management team indicated that they planned to appeal the result in hopes that it would be changed to a no contest, and hoped that the UFC could schedule a rematch with Faber.  Ultimately, the NSAC upheld the result of a submission victory for Faber.

Rivera faced Alex Caceres on June 6, 2015 at UFC Fight Night 68. He won the fight via knockout in the first round.

Rivera faced John Lineker on September 5, 2015 at UFC 191. He lost the fight via submission in the first round. The wild slugfest earned both participants Fight of the Night honors.

Rivera faced Brad Pickett on February 27, 2016 at UFC Fight Night 84. He lost the back-and-forth fight via split decision.

Rivera next faced Érik Pérez on July 30, 2016 at UFC 201. He lost the fight via unanimous decision.

Rivera received a four-year USADA suspension for testing positive for a banned substance clenbuterol, collected from an out of competition sample on July 23, 2016. He was subsequently released from the promotion.

Post-UFC career
Rivera was given a license to compete in California, and was scheduled to fight Trevin Jones at LXF 6 on March 20, 2020, but the event was cancelled due to the COVID-19 pandemic.

Rivera then faced Ryan Lilley at XMMA 8 on January 30, 2021. He won the fight via first-round knockout.

Rivera faced Adam Martinez in the first bout of the one night bantamweight tournament at Combate Global: Bantamweight Tournament on May 29, 2021. He won the bout via KO in the first round of a one round bout. In the Semifinals, he faced fellow UFC vet Nohelin Hernandez, who he defeated via unanimous decision. In the finals, Rivera faced David Martinez, to whom he lost in the second round after being dropped by a head kick and finished on the ground.

Rivera faced John Dodson on April 2, 2022 at XMMA 4. He lost the bout via unanimous decision.

Rivera faced Teruto Ishihara on August 20, 2022 at UNF 2. He won the bout via unanimous decision.

Rivera faced fellow UFC veteran Cody Gibson at Up Next Fighting 3: Rivera vs. Gibson for the inaugural UNF Bantamweight Championship. Rivera lost the bout via submission in the third round due to an arm triangle choke.

Championships and achievements 
Ultimate Fighting Championship
Fight of the Night (One time) 
Sherdog
2012 All-Violence First Team
2013 All-Violence Third Team

Mixed martial arts record 

|-
|
|align=center|
|Chris Beal
|
|UNF 6
|
|align=center|
|align=center|
|Commerce, California, United States
|
|-
|Loss
|align=center|15–10 (1)
|Cody Gibson
|Submission (arm-triangle choke)
|UNF 3
|
|align=center|3
|align=center|2:42
|Commerce, California, United States
|
|-
|Win
|align=center|15–9 (1)
|Teruto Ishihara
|Decision (unanimous)
|UNF 2
|
|align=center|3
|align=center|5:00
|Commerce, California, United States
|
|-
|Loss
|align=center|14–9 (1)
|John Dodson
|Decision (unanimous)
|XMMA 4: Black Magic
|
|align=center|3
|align=center|5:00
|New Orleans, Louisiana, United States
|
|-
|Loss
|align=center|14–8 (1)
|David Martinez
|KO (head kick and punches)
| rowspan=3|Combate Global: Bantamweight Tournament
| rowspan=3|
|align=center|2
|align=center|0:17
| rowspan=3|Miami, Florida, United States
| 
|-
|Win
|align=center|14–7 (1)
|Nohelin Hernandez
|Decision (unanimous)
|align=center|3
|align=center|5:00
| 
|-
|Win
|align=center|13–7 (1)
|Adam Martinez
|KO (punch)
|align=center|1
|align=center|2:39
| 
|-
|Win
|align=center|12–7 (1)
|Ryan Lilley
|TKO (punches)
|XMMA: Vick vs Fialho
|
|align=center|1
|align=center|4:03
|West Palm Beach, Florida, United States
| 
|-
|Loss
|align=center|11–7 (1)
|Érik Pérez
|Decision (unanimous)
|UFC 201 
|
|align=center|3
|align=center|5:00
|Atlanta, Georgia, United States
|
|-
|Loss
|align=center|11–6 (1)
|Brad Pickett
|Decision (split)
|UFC Fight Night: Silva vs. Bisping
|
|align=center|3
|align=center|5:00
|London, England
| 
|-
| Loss
| align=center| 11–5 (1)
| John Lineker
| Submission (guillotine choke)
| UFC 191
| 
| align=center| 1
| align=center| 2:08
| Las Vegas, Nevada, United States
| 
|-
| Win
| align=center| 11–4 (1)
| Alex Caceres
| KO (punches)
| UFC Fight Night: Boetsch vs. Henderson
| 
| align=center| 1
| align=center| 0:21
| New Orleans, Louisiana, United States
| 
|-
| Loss
| align=center| 10–4 (1)
| Urijah Faber
| Submission (bulldog choke)
| UFC 181
| 
| align=center| 2
| align=center| 1:34
| Las Vegas, Nevada, United States
| 
|-
| Loss
| align=center| 10–3 (1)
| Takeya Mizugaki
| Decision (unanimous)
| UFC 173
| 
| align=center| 3
| align=center| 5:00
| Las Vegas, Nevada, United States
| 
|-
| Win
| align=center| 10–2 (1) 
| George Roop
| TKO (punches)
| UFC: Fight for the Troops 3
| 
| align=center| 2
| align=center| 2:20
| Fort Campbell, Kentucky, United States
| 
|-
| Win
| align=center| 9–2 (1)
| Edwin Figueroa
| TKO (punches)
| UFC 156
| 
| align=center| 2
| align=center| 4:20
| Las Vegas, Nevada, United States
| 
|-
| NC
| align=center| 8–2 (1)
| Roland Delorme
| NC (overturned)
| UFC 149
| 
| align=center| 1
| align=center| 4:19
| Calgary, Alberta, Canada
| 
|-
| Win
| align=center| 8–2
| Alex Soto
| Decision (unanimous)
| UFC on Fuel TV: Korean Zombie vs. Poirier
| 
| align=center| 3
| align=center| 5:00
| Fairfax, Virginia, United States
| 
|-
| Win
| align=center| 7–2
| Antonio Duarte
| KO (punches)
| Tachi Palace Fights 12
| 
| align=center| 1
| align=center| 1:15
| Lemoore, California, United States
| 
|-
| Win
| align=center| 6–2
| Brad McDonald
| KO (punches)
| TPF 11: Redemption
| 
| align=center| 1
| align=center| 0:40
| Lemoore, California, United States
| 
|-
| Loss
| align=center| 5–2
| Reuben Duran
| Submission (rear-naked choke)
| The Ultimate Fighter: Team Lesnar vs. Team dos Santos Finale
| 
| align=center| 3
| align=center| 1:57
| Las Vegas, Nevada, United States
| 
|-
| Loss
| align=center| 5–1
| Erik Koch
| TKO (head kick and punches)
| WEC 52
| 
| align=center| 1
| align=center| 1:36
| Las Vegas, Nevada, United States
| 
|-
| Win
| align=center| 5–0
| Fernando Bernstein
| TKO (punches)
| Called Out MMA 2
| 
| align=center| 1
| align=center| 0:30
| Ontario, California, United States
| 
|-
| Win
| align=center| 4–0
| Aaron Arana
| Decision (majority)
| Called Out MMA 1
| 
| align=center| 3
| align=center| 5:00
| Ontario, California, United States
| 
|-
| Win
| align=center| 3–0
| Johnny Gomez
| Decision (unanimous)
| Call To Arms 1
| 
| align=center| 3
| align=center| 5:00
| Ontario, California, United States
| 
|-
| Win
| align=center| 2–0
| Chris Drumm
| KO (punches)
| California Xtreme Fighting
| 
| align=center| 1
| align=center| 0:46
| El Monte, California, United States
| 
|-
| Win
| align=center| 1–0
| Ray Cox
| KO (punches)
| CXF: Uprising in Upland
| 
| align=center| 1
| align=center| 0:52
| Upland, California, United States
|

Amateur mixed martial arts record

|-
|  Win
|align=center| 1–0
|Adam Martinez
|KO (punch)
|Combate Global: Bantamweight Tournament
|
|align=center|1
|align=center|2:39
| Miami, Florida, United States
| 
|-
|}

See also 
 List of current UFC fighters
 List of male mixed martial artists

References

External links 
 
 Official UFC Profile
 Francisco Rivera - UFC Fans

Bantamweight mixed martial artists
American male mixed martial artists
American sportspeople in doping cases
Doping cases in mixed martial arts
Mixed martial artists from California
Sportspeople from Whittier, California
Living people
1981 births
People from Buena Park, California
Ultimate Fighting Championship male fighters